Pintoa is a monotypic genus of flowering plants belonging to the family Zygophyllaceae. It only contains one known species, Pintoa chilensis Gay

Its native range is northern Chile.

The genus name of Pintoa is in honour of Francisco Antonio Pinto (1785–1858), a Chilean politician who served as President of Chile between 1827 and 1829. The Latin specific epithet of chilensis means "coming from Chile", where the plant was found. 
Both the genus and the species were first described and published in Fl. Chil. Vol.1 on page 479 in 1846.

References

Zygophyllaceae
Rosid genera
Plants described in 1846
Flora of Chile